Wierden is a railway station serving the village Wierden in the Netherlands. The station was opened on 1 January 1881. It is located on the Deventer–Almelo railway and the Zwolle–Almelo railway. The train services are operated by Nederlandse Spoorwegen.

Train services

Bus services

There is no bus service at this station. The nearest bus stop is N.H. Kerk, 700m away.

External links
NS website 
Dutch Public Transport journey planner 

Railway stations in Overijssel
Railway stations opened in 1881
Wierden
1881 establishments in the Netherlands
Railway stations in the Netherlands opened in the 19th century